Sex Differences in Cognitive Abilities is a book by Diane Halpern published by Lawrence Erlbaum Associates in 2000, and now in its fourth edition. Halpern served as president of the American Psychological Association in 2004.

Halpern writes that sex differences in cognitive abilities can be caused by a "stereotype threat", defined as "the fear of conforming to a negative stereotype associated with one's group membership, which paradoxically results in the individual behaving in line with the stereotype". If an individual is made aware of a stereotype then "the activation of stereotypes might explain why the magnitude of sex differences in sex-sensitive cognitive task varies across studies, depending on whether participants gender-stereotypes are activated or not".

See also
 Biology of gender
 Sex and psychology

References

Sex Differences in Cognitive Abilities